() is the executive non-departmental public body of the Scottish Government with responsibility for Gaelic. It was established by an Act of the Scottish Parliament in 2005 (which took effect in early 2006) and is based in Inverness.

Structure
 is a non-departmental public body constituted of members of the board, whose role is "to provide leadership, direction, support and guidance" to the body, and staff who are typically full-time public sector employees and who carry out the day-to-day work of the body.

History
In 2006  was designated as the body responsible for implementing the Gaelic Language (Scotland) Act 2005 and specifically, as stated in the Act, "securing the status of the Gaelic language as an official language of Scotland commanding equal respect to the English language".  The Bòrd represents a cornerstone of the Scottish Government's implementation of their duties under the European Charter for Regional or Minority Languages.

See also
 
 Languages of Scotland
 Language revitalization
 
 Columba Project
 , all-Ireland agency set up to promote the Irish language under the Good Friday Agreement of 1998.

References

External links
 

Executive non-departmental public bodies of the Scottish Government
Scottish Gaelic language
Language regulators
Organisations based in Inverness
2003 establishments in Scotland
Government agencies established in 2003